Bembidion levettei is a species of ground beetle in the family Carabidae. It is found in North America.

Subspecies
These two subspecies belong to the species Bembidion levettei:
 Bembidion levettei carrianum Casey, 1924
 Bembidion levettei levettei Casey, 1918

References

Further reading

External links

 

levettei
Articles created by Qbugbot
Beetles described in 1918